Norway was represented by 16-year-old Silje Vige, with the song "Alle mine tankar", at the 1993 Eurovision Song Contest, which took place on 15 May in Millstreet, Ireland. "Alle mine tankar" was chosen as the Norwegian entry at the Melodi Grand Prix on 6 March.

Before Eurovision

Melodi Grand Prix 1993 
The final was held at the Chateau Neuf in Oslo, hosted by Ingunn Kyrkjebø. Eight songs took part with the winner being chosen by voting from eight regional juries. Other participants included three-time Norwegian representative and MGP regular Jahn Teigen, the previous year's singer Merethe Trøan, and Tor Endresen who would represent Norway in 1997.

At Eurovision 
On the night of the final Vige performed last in the running order, following Israel. "Alle mine tankar" was an unusually structured song with an instrumental arrangement featuring a bouzouki and an accordion, which commentators remarked as most un-Norwegian. The song began in a very gentle, low-key way before building to a still gentle yet catchy refrain. It was a distinctive song with which to close the contest, and received a very enthuisiatic response from the audience. At the close of voting "Alle mine tankar" had received 120 points, placing Norway 5th of the 25 entries, the country's first top 10 finish since 1988. It did however seem to have had a polarising effect on the other national juries – it had received maximum 12s from Croatia, Greece and Finland, and second-place 10s from four other countries, yet nine of the juries placed it outside their top 10 and awarded it no points at all. The Norwegian jury awarded its 12 points to contest winners Ireland.

Voting

References

External links 
Full national final on nrk.no

1993
Countries in the Eurovision Song Contest 1993
1993
Eurovision
Eurovision